Dimitrovka is a village in the Ismailli Rayon of Azerbaijan.

References 

Populated places in Ismayilli District